Nichlava (medieval name - Sarnik) is a river in Ukraine, within the Chortkiv Raion of Ternopil Oblast. Left tributary of the Dniester (Black Sea basin).

Description and location
Length 83 km. The catchment area is 871 km. The slope of the river is 2.1 m / km. River waters are used for technical water supply.

Nichlava originates from the tract "Nichlava", located in the village Krogulets. The origin of the name of the tract is unknown. From the beginning of the source in the village it forms three ponds, and then flows past the village of Chagari. It flows within the Podolsk Upland mainly to the south. It flows into the Dniester near the village of Ustya, Chortkiv Raion.

Nichlava has the main right (western) tributary - Nichlava, the source of which is located near the village of Yabluniv, Chortkiv district. The confluence of the Nichlavka and Nichlava rivers is located between the villages of Kolyndyany and Davydkivtsi. At the confluence of the tributary is flooded than Nichlava.

Tributaries
Right: Nichlavka, Drapaka.

Left: Gypsy.

Settlements
Above the river are the following villages, towns, cities (from the source to the mouth): Chagari, Krogulets, Kotsyubyntsi, Zhabyntsi, Probizhna, Velyki Chornokintsi, Davydkivtsi, Tarnavka, Pilatkivtsi, Zhylyntsi, Lanivtsi, Verkhnyakivtsi, Borshchiv, Vysichka, Pyshchatyntsi, Strelkiv, Skovyatyn, Shyshkivtsi, Khudiivtsi, Babyntsi, Pylypche, Mykhalkiv, Ustya.

References

Sources
 Географічна енциклопедія України : [у 3 т.] / редкол.: О. М. Маринич (відповід. ред.) та ін. — К., 1989—1993. — 33 000 екз. — ISBN 5-88500-015-8.
 Нічлава // Словник гідронімів України / Уклад. І. М. Железняк, А. П. Корепанова, Л. Т. Масенко [та ін.] ; Редкол. : К. К. Цілуйко (голова) та ін. — К. : Наукова думка, 1979. — С. 390.
 Каталог річок України. — К. : Видавництво АН УРСР, 1957.
 Свинко Й. Нічлава // Тернопільський енциклопедичний словник : у 4 т. / редкол.: Г. Яворський та ін. — Тернопіль : Видавничо-поліграфічний комбінат «Збруч», 2005. — Т. 2 : К — О. — 706 с. — ISBN 966-528-199-2.
  — S. 34—35. 

Rivers of Ternopil Oblast